Peter (Petter) Jacob Hjelm (2 October 1746 – 7 October 1813) was a Swedish chemist and the first person to isolate the element molybdenum in 1781, four years after its discovery by Swedish chemist Carl Wilhelm Scheele. Working with Molybdic acid, Hjelm chemically reduced molybdenum oxide with carbon in an oxygen-free atmosphere, resulting in carbon dioxide and a near-pure dark metal powder to which he gave the name 'molybdenum'. His first publication on molybdenum appeared in 1790.

Childhood 
Hjelm was born at Sunnerbo in Småland,  Sweden in 1746. The son of parish priest Erik Hjelm and Cecilia Cecilia Gistrénia, he was raised in the parish of Göteryd in Älmhult.

Career 
After studying at the University of Uppsala, he received his Ph.D. He became professor at the Mining academy and in 1782 he became Proberare of the Royal Mint, with the job of analyzing minerals to determine their content. From 1784 on he was a member of the Royal Swedish Academy of Sciences. His last position was as director of the  Chemical Laboratory at the Ministry of Mining.

References

Literature

1746 births
1813 deaths
18th-century Swedish chemists
Swedish metallurgists
Academic staff of Uppsala University
Members of the Royal Swedish Academy of Sciences
19th-century Swedish chemists
Rare earth scientists